Richard Maxwell Drew (June 26, 1822 – July 11, 1850) was an American politician who served in the Louisiana House of Representatives from 1848 to 1850.

References

1822 births
1850 deaths
Louisiana lawyers
Louisiana state court judges
Members of the Louisiana House of Representatives
People from Claiborne Parish, Louisiana
Politicians from Minden, Louisiana
19th-century American politicians
19th-century American judges
19th-century American lawyers